Nima Yaghobi (born 25 December 1995), known professionally as Nimo, is a German rapper. He was signed to 385idéal, but founded his own label, Moonboys Entertainment, in January 2021.

Early life
Born in Karlsruhe, Germany to Iranian parents, his family later moved to Leonberg. At the age of 15, he was sent to juvenile detention because of multiple offences.

Discography

Studio albums

Collaborative albums

Mixtapes

Singles

As lead artist

As featured artist

Other charted songs

Awards and nominations

Results

References

External links

 

German rappers
German people of Iranian descent
1995 births
Living people